George "Duke" Robinson (born October 10, 1986) was an offensive lineman for the Oklahoma Sooners. In 2007, he was named a first team All-American by the American Football Coaches Association, becoming Oklahoma's 143rd All-American.

References

Oklahoma Sooners football players
Living people
1986 births
American football offensive linemen